Hackers Wanted is an unreleased American documentary film.

Directed and written by Sam Bozzo, the film explores the origins and nature of hackers and hacking by following the adventures of Adrian Lamo, and contrasting his story with that of controversial figures throughout history. The film is narrated by Kevin Spacey.

Originally named "Can You Hack It?" in 2007, the film failed to get a conventional release, according to Lamo, because of conflicts between its producer and others on the team. The more commonly cited reason is a problem with the quality of the finished product.  On May 20, 2010, a version of the film was leaked to BitTorrent. Lamo has stated that he had no involvement in the leak.

On June 12, 2010, a director's cut version of the film was also leaked onto torrent sites. This version of the film contains additional footage and is significantly different from the one previously leaked.

See also 
 Phreaking
 Trigger Street Productions
 Blue box
 John Draper
 Steve Wozniak
 Leo Laporte
 Kevin Rose

References

External links
Hackers Wanted Trailer

American independent films
Documentary films about the Internet
Unreleased American films
Hacking (computer security)
Works about computer hacking